Jan Tomaszewski (born 9 January 1948) is a Polish former professional footballer who played as a goalkeeper in the 1970s. He kept goal for the Poland national teams that came third at the 1974 World Cup, where he was named Best Goalkeeper, that won the silver medal at the 1976 Summer Olympics, and that competed at the 1978 World Cup. He is regarded as one of the best goalkeepers in the history of Polish football. He was later a football commentator and politician.

Club career
Tomaszewski grew up in Wrocław where his parents were expelled from Vilnius after World War II. 

Tomaszewski's club career was mainly at ŁKS Łódź, having been forbidden by Poland's communist government to play abroad before the age of 30, even after coming to international attention.

After the 1978 World Cup, he moved abroad, first to Belgian club Beerschot, and then Hércules in Spain, before retiring in 1984 after two more years with Łódź. In all he won 63 caps for Poland, making him at the time his country's most-capped goalkeeper, although that record was later broken by Artur Boruc in 2016.

International career
Tomaszewski is best remembered by some for his performance for the Poland national team against England, in a qualifying match for the 1974 World Cup, which England needed to win.
Tomaszewski had been labelled "a clown" by Brian Clough before the match (the two men however became quite friendly in later years), but had the last laugh as he turned in a man-of-the-match performance repeatedly denying England's attackers; the only goal he conceded being an equalizing penalty from Allan Clarke.
Earlier, Jan Domarski had scored for the Poles.  Poland drew the game 1–1 and qualified for the finals in West Germany at the expense of England.

In "The Story of the World Cup", Brian Glanville wrote: "In retrospect, to be eliminated by so fine a side as Poland seems no disgrace, but this is a posteriori reasoning. I doubt if England could have made so dazzling a contribution as Poland to the tournament, yet it should be remembered that the Poland which beat England and the Poland which took their place were two very different propositions". (p. 191, 2005 edn.)

International

Other achievements
Poland went on to claim third place during a World Cup in which Tomaszewski saved two penalties in two different matches (from Staffan Tapper and Uli Hoeneß) – the first 'keeper in FIFA World Cup history to do so. Tomaszewski went on to win a silver medal with Poland at the 1976 Summer Olympics, and also played in the 1978 World Cup, where Poland disappointed in only managing to get as far as the second group phase. Between 1989–1990, he served as the goalkeepers' coach of the Poland national football team led by Andrzej Strejlau.

Later life
After his playing career he worked as a commentator and sports journalist writing articles in magazines including Przegląd Sportowy. In 1986, he graduated from the University of Physical Education in Warsaw. In 1991, he published a book titled Kulisy reprezentacyjnej piłki (Promise Publishing Institute, Łódź). Known for making many controversial statements, he criticised the Polish Football Association (PZPN) on a number of occasions when the organization was run by Marian Dziurowicz and Michał Listkiewicz. He was elected to the Sejm at the 2011 election, representing Łódź for Law and Justice.

Personal life
He was married three times. He married his third wife, Katarzyna (née Calińska), in 1988. She was a Polish Champion in table tennis. Tomaszewski has two daughters with her: Paulina and Małgorzata.

See also
Sport in Poland
Poland national football team

References

External links
 
 
 Jan Tomaszewski Profile at goalkeepersaredifferent.com

1948 births
Living people
Sportspeople from Wrocław
Polish footballers
Poland international footballers
Association football goalkeepers
Footballers at the 1976 Summer Olympics
Olympic footballers of Poland
Medalists at the 1976 Summer Olympics
Olympic medalists in football
Olympic silver medalists for Poland
Śląsk Wrocław players
Legia Warsaw players
ŁKS Łódź players
K. Beerschot V.A.C. players
1974 FIFA World Cup players
1978 FIFA World Cup players
La Liga players
Hércules CF players
Belgian Pro League players
Ekstraklasa players
Members of the Polish Sejm 2011–2015
Law and Justice politicians
Polish sportsperson-politicians
Polish football managers
Widzew Łódź managers
Polish expatriate footballers
Polish expatriate sportspeople in Belgium
Expatriate footballers in Belgium
Polish expatriate sportspeople in Spain
Expatriate footballers in Spain